Parklawn may refer to:
Parklawn, California
an area of The Queensway – Humber Bay, Canada
Parklawn Memorial Park, a cemetery in Rockville, Maryland, United States